Minchee, or minchi, is a Macanese dish based on minced or ground meat.  It is made with beef or pork and diced onions that is flavoured with Worcestershire sauce, molasses and soy sauce with cubed potatoes slightly stir-fried. When served with a fried egg on top it is called min5 zi6 caau2 daan2.

History
The name minchi is thought to be derived from the English word "minced," suggesting that the cuisine was brought to Macau by Hong Kong's Anglophone community however, others attribute its roots to Goa, another former Portuguese province.

External links
 Fat Rice cookbook, Macanese cuisine as envisioned by three Chicago natives
 Minchee: Meat and potato hash from Macau

National dishes
Macanese cuisine